Stenalia macrocephala is a beetle in the genus Stenalia of the family Mordellidae. It was described in 1957 by Franciscolo.

References

macrocephala
Beetles described in 1957